The 2001 V8 Supercar season was the 42nd year of touring car racing in Australia since the first runnings of the Australian Touring Car Championship and the fore-runner of the present day Bathurst 1000, the Armstrong 500.

There were 22 touring car race meetings held during 2001; a thirteen-round series for V8 Supercars, the 2001 Shell Championship Series (SCS), two of them endurance races; a six-round second tier V8 Supercar series 2001 Konica V8 Supercar Series (KVS) along with a non-point scoring race supporting the Bathurst 1000 and V8 Supercar support programme events at the 2001 Australian Grand Prix and 2001 Honda Indy 300.

Results and standings

Race calendar
The 2001 Australian touring car season consisted of 22 events.

Konica V8 Supercar Series

Hot Wheels V8 Supercar Showdown 
This meeting was a support event of the 2001 Australian Grand Prix.

Shell Championship Series

Konica V8Supercar Challenge Race 
This race was a support event of the 2001 V8 Supercar 1000.

Cabcharge V8Supercar Challenge 
This meeting was a support event of the 2001 Honda Indy 300.

References

Additional references can be found in linked event/series reports.

External links
 Official V8 Supercar site
 2001 Racing Results Archive

 
Supercar seasons